William Sawalich (born October 3, 2006) is an American professional stock car racing driver. He competes full-time in the ARCA Menards Series East, and part-time in the ARCA Menards Series and ARCA Menards Series West, driving the No. 18 Toyota Camry for Joe Gibbs Racing, along with running part-time in the NASCAR Craftsman Truck Series, driving the No. 1 Toyota Tundra for TRICON Garage. He also competes in various late model events across the United States.

Racing career

Early career
Sawalich began racing at the age of nine, running various midget races, including Sr. Animal's and World Formula. From 2017 to 2019, he won several track championships at Little Elko Speedway.

He moved into legends cars in 2020, winning the INEX Young Lions State Championship in Minnesota. He scored multiple top fives and podiums during his legends car efforts. He won an INEX sanctioned Legends division feature race at Elko Speedway (MN) on August 22, 2020.

Late models
Sawalich made the transition to late models in 2021, running nearly a full season in the Carolina Pro Late Model Series. Despite missing two races, he finished fourth in the standings, with one win at Carteret County Speedway, and seven top fives. Along with that, he continued to run in select legend car races. He made his CARS Tour debut at Tri-County Motor Speedway in September, in which he started on the pole. He finished 17th after being involved in a late-rate accident.

In 2022, Sawalich increased his late model schedule, running in the CARS Tour, the Champion Racing Association, the ARCA Midwest Tour, the Southern Super Series, and the World Series of Asphalt Stock Car Racing. In the CARS Tour, Sawalich ran nine races, earning six wins, four of them in row. His streak came to an end at Tri-County in September, after he got spun on the last lap by Jake Garcia.

ARCA Menards Series
On December 9, 2022, Joe Gibbs Racing announced that Sawalich would join the team in 2023, running 20 races across all three of ARCA's divisions. This would include a full season in the ARCA Menards Series East, along with select races in the main and West Series. William made his debut at Phoenix on March 10, 2023 winning the pole and finishing 13th.

Personal life 
William's father, Brandon, is the president of Starkey Hearing Technologies, which sponsors his racing efforts. He is currently an online student at Liberty University Online Academy.

Motorsports career results

NASCAR
(key) (Bold – Pole position awarded by qualifying time. Italics – Pole position earned by points standings or practice time. * – Most laps led.)

Craftsman Truck Series

ARCA Menards Series
(key) (Bold – Pole position awarded by qualifying time. Italics – Pole position earned by points standings or practice time. * – Most laps led. ** – All laps led.)

ARCA Menards Series East

ARCA Menards Series West

References

External links 
 
 

Living people
2006 births
ARCA Menards Series drivers
NASCAR drivers
Joe Gibbs Racing drivers
Racing drivers from Minnesota
CARS Tour drivers